"Hallelujah" is a song by American rock band Paramore, released as the second single from their second studio album Riot!. The single peaked at No. 139 on the UK Singles Chart. The song is not to be confused with the Leonard Cohen song of the same name, although on the Final Riot! summer 2008 tour, lead singer Hayley Williams performed an extract, accompanied by lead guitarist, Josh Farro.

Music video
The video, directed by Big TV!, was officially released on July 30, 2007. The video appears as a photo montage of backstage and live performance photos, with the lyrics of the song written in the spaces between the photos. The video will zoom in and out on some of the photos. When the photo fills the entire screen, the photo will be revealed to actually be a short video clip, and the video clip will play. The video was shot at Rocketown in Nashville, USA when the band were playing their Riot! tour, even though the music is playing over the concert performance.

As of April 2022, the song has 16 million views on YouTube.

Cover versions and usage in media
The Rusty Pipes covered an a cappella version of the song (including Leonard Cohen's song of the same name) at their 13th Annual Pipe-A-Thon on December 12, 2009, and posted it on their YouTube channel on January 24, 2010.

The Vitamin String Quartet covered this song along with other Paramore songs, which were released as a downloadable album.

The song was featured in an episode of the British television soap opera Hollyoaks in October 2008 ("Misery Business" was also used in another episode in March 2008 and then later "Born for This" in September 2008). The song was also featured twice (once as a string quartet version) on the fourth season of So You Think You Can Dance.

Single release
A CD single and two 7"s were released in the UK on 10 September.

Charts

Release history

References

2007 singles
Paramore songs
Songs written by Hayley Williams
Songs written by Josh Farro
2007 songs
Fueled by Ramen singles
Song recordings produced by David Bendeth
Music videos directed by Big T.V.